Toni D. Newman (born December 3, 1962) is an African-American transgender author, sex workers' rights advocate, Director of The Coalition for Justice and Equality Across Movements at NMAC, and the Former Interim CEO of the Black AIDS Institute and former Interim Executive Director/President for LYRIC in San Francisco. She was the former Executive Director of St. James Infirmary in San Francisco. She is the author of I Rise-The Transformation of Toni Newman, a 2011 memoir about her gender transition which was nominated for multiple Lambda Literary Awards and became the basis for a short film, Heart of a Woman.

Newman was raised in Jacksonville, North Carolina. She graduated from Wake Forest University in 1985. Prior to becoming Executive Director of St. James Infirmary in May 2018, Newman worked as interim director of development and communications for the To Help Everyone Health and Wellness Center in Los Angeles, as a strategic fundraiser and legislative aide for Equality California, and as development officer for Maitri Compassionate Care.

References

External links

1962 births
African-American activists
African-American women writers
LGBT African Americans
LGBT people from the San Francisco Bay Area
Living people
People from Jacksonville, North Carolina
Sex worker activists in the United States
Transgender women
LGBT people from North Carolina
21st-century American women
21st-century African-American women
20th-century African-American people
20th-century African-American women
American transgender writers